I Like Mike is a 1961 Israeli drama film directed by Canadian-born Peter Frye. It was entered into the 1961 Cannes Film Festival. It was based on Aharon Megged's play, which was performed at the Habima theatre.

Plot
Yafa Arieli wants to marry her daughter, Tamara to Mike, a young American and son of a Texas tycoon visiting in Israel, but Tamara is in love with Micha, a Nahal officer and a poor kibbutznik. During his flight to Israel, Mike sees a newspaper picture of a Yemenite soldier, falls in love with her, and swears to find her. Eventually, Mike finds the soldier, Nilli, who lives in a kibbutz in the Negev region, and he decides to become a Kibbutznik.

Cast
 Batya Lancet  as the mother, Yafa Arieli
 Gideon Singer
 Ze'ev Berlinsky
 Ilana Rovina as the daughter, Tamar
 Meira Shor
 Seymour Gitin as Mike (Michael Abrahams), an American tourist
 Topol
 Geula Nuni
 Avner Hizkiyahu
 Eitan Gitin
 Bernie Rachelle as Arik (with Topol)

References

External links

1961 films
1961 drama films
Israeli black-and-white films
1960s Hebrew-language films